Analog Fluids of Sonic Black Holes is the third studio album by American musician Moor Mother. It was released on November 8, 2019, under Don Giovanni Records.

The first single "After Images", a collaboration with Justin Broadrick from Godflesh, was released on August 27, 2019.

Critical reception

Analog Fluids of Sonic Black Holes was met with universal acclaim reviews from critics. At Metacritic, which assigns a weighted average rating out of 100 to reviews from mainstream publications, this release received an average score of 82, based on 8 reviews.

Accolades

Track listing

References

2019 albums
Moor Mother albums
Don Giovanni Records albums